Nerl River may refer to:
 Nerl River (Klyazma), a river in the Yaroslavl, Ivanovo, and Vladimir Oblasts, tributary of the Klyazma
 Nerl River (Volga), a river in the Yaroslavl and Tver Oblasts, tributary of the Volga